Kevin Kraxner (born May 21, 1986) is a former Austrian ice hockey forward who played for Vienna Capitals of the Austrian Hockey League, he ended his career on April 28, 2011 due to a hip injury.

Kraxner began playing for Graz U20 before moving to Germany where he spent two seasons with the Rosenheim Star Bulls.  In 2005 he returned to Graz at senior level where he continues to play.  2006-07 was a good season for Kraxner, scoring 19 points (8G and 11A) in 46 games.  However, in 2007-08, he only managed to score 2 points in 42 games.

External links

1986 births
Austrian ice hockey forwards
Graz 99ers players
Living people
Place of birth missing (living people)
Vienna Capitals players